Westendstraße 1 is a 53-storey,  skyscraper in the Westend-Süd district of Frankfurt, Germany. The structure was completed in 1993 and together with the nearby City-Haus, forms the headquarters of DZ Bank. In 1995 it won the "Best Building of the Year" award by the American Chamber of Architects in the multifunctional skyscraper category. The tower is the third tallest skyscraper in Frankfurt and also in Germany.

Design

Overview 
The building, designed by Kohn Pedersen Fox, is similar in style to an older building by the same architects, 1250 René-Lévesque in Montreal, Quebec, Canada. The building is a reinforced concrete structure with a perforated facades and flat slabs. Each floor height is around 3.6 metres with a floor area of 950 square metres. The facade consists of fine, golden granite, giving it a white and bright appearance from afar. The building was designed by architect William Pedersen. The characteristic ring beam at the top of the tower (known commonly as the crown) is intended as a reminder to Frankfurt's history as the city where German emperors were crowned. The crown faces towards the old part of Frankfurt where the coronations were held at the Frankfurt Cathedral. The 95 tonne steel crown is heated in winter to prevent the forming of icicles which could endanger pedestrians or cars on the street below. The design for Moshe Aviv Tower also called "City Gate" skyscraper in Ramat Gan was inspired by the building.

Features 
A sculpture by Claes Oldenburg and Coosje van Bruggen, called Inverted Collar and Tie is set up in front of the entrance.

In popular culture 

 Westendstrasse 1 appears under the name Khoury Art Foundation Building as a vanilla stage 8 Euro-Contemporary building set in SimCity 4 (Deluxe or with Rush Hour).

Gallery

Skyscrapers in Frankfurt

See also 
 List of tallest buildings in Frankfurt
 List of tallest buildings in Germany
 List of tallest buildings in the European Union
 List of tallest buildings in Europe

References 

Skyscrapers in Frankfurt
Office buildings completed in 1993
Kohn Pedersen Fox buildings
Bankenviertel
Skyscraper office buildings in Germany